MTV was a pan-Asian pay-television channel owned by Paramount Networks EMEAA that launched on 3 May 1995.

History

Pre-launch

The first incarnation of MTV Asia was originally launched on 15 September 1991. It was owned by a joint-venture between the STAR TV Network and Viacom. Three years later, MTV Asia left the STAR TV Network on 2 May 1994, with the channel's space being taken by Channel V on 27 May 1994.

Launch
MTV Asia was officially launched on 3 May 1995 as a 24-hour English-language channel broadcast from Singapore seen throughout Southeast Asia in territories including Brunei, Cambodia, Indonesia, Malaysia, the Philippines, Singapore, Thailand and Vietnam. 

At the same time, MTV Asia, along with sister channel MTV Indonesia, was launched on the Palapa C2 digital satellite.

From 1 May 2021 until 1 September 2022, MTV Asia shortened its broadcast of programs to 8 hours (4:00pm to 12:00mn (SGT)) to simulcast programs from sister channel MTV Live from 12:00mn to 4:00pm (SGT)) daily as MTV Asia focused on more music content, with less entertainment programming on its schedule.

Closure
As part of a restructuring at Paramount Networks EMEAA and as preparation of the launch of Paramount+ in Southeast Asia in 2023, MTV Asia began to cease broadcasting in several territories. In Singapore, following StarHub's review of its content offerings, and the recent launch of MTV Asia On Demand, MTV Asia ceased on StarHub TV on 29 April 2022.

VJs

Final programming

Music video blocks
MTV Rewind
Hot Right Now!
High Definition Hits
Rock Solid Playlist
Global Beats!
K-Wave
MTV Musika

Concert/Acoustic
MTV World Stage
MTV Unplugged

Former programs
List of programmes broadcast by MTV in Asia

See also
MTV
MTV Mandarin (1995–2003, split)
MTV Taiwan (2003–ongoing)
MTV China (2003–2021, defunct)
MTV India (1996–ongoing)
MTV Korea (2001–2022, defunct)
MTV Pakistan (2006–2011, defunct)
MTV Vietnam (2011–2023, defunct)
MTV Thailand (2001–2011, 2013–2016, defunct)
MTV Philippines (1992–2010, defunct)
 Studio 23 (1996–1999)
 IBC 13 (2005) 
MTV Pinoy (2014–2016, 2017, defunct)
MTV Indonesia (1995–2011, 2014–2015, defunct)
 antv (1995–2002)
 Global TV (2002–2012)
 CTV Banten (2014–2015)
 RTV (2015)
MTVph (2017–2018, defunct)
Paramount International Networks (formerly MTV Networks Asia Pacific)

References

MTV channels
Television stations in Singapore
Broadcasting in Singapore
Mass media in Singapore
Mass media in Southeast Asia
Music organisations based in Singapore
Television channels and stations established in 1995
Television channels and stations disestablished in 2022